Major-General Henry MacKinnon (August 1773 – 19 January 1812), was a British soldier.  He commanded the 45th Regiment of Foot, 74th (Highland) Regiment of Foot, and 88th Regiment of Foot in the Napoleonic Peninsular War under the Duke of Wellington.  He was killed by the explosion of an enemy magazine during the Siege of Ciudad Rodrigo on 19 January 1812.

Prior to the Napoleonic wars, MacKinnon had a cordial acquaintance with Napoleon Bonaparte while the former's father resided in the French Province of Dauphiny when Napoleon was a frequent visitor to the region.

Notes and citations

Notes

Citations

References

 Memoirs of the Clan Fingon, Donald MacKinnon, Lewis Hepworth and Company, Tunbridge Wells and London, 1899.
 History of the Peninsular War, Robert Southey, John Murray publisher, 1823

British Army generals
British military personnel killed in action in the Napoleonic Wars
British Army personnel of the Napoleonic Wars
1773 births
1812 deaths